The 1977 National Soccer League season was the first season of the National Soccer League of Australia. The league was not only the first national soccer league in Australia but the first of any of the forms of football in Australia. Clubs predominantly joined from the top leagues in each state, with the exception of Tasmanian and Western Australia, and Canberra City forming in 1977 to join the league. The inaugural champions were Eastern Suburbs.

Background

Attempts had been made to start a national league several times during the 1960s and 1970s, however it wasn't until 1975 that the talk became serious. In April 1975, nine clubs from New South Wales, Queensland and South Australia agreed to form a national league in either 1976 or 1977. Frank Lowy, president of Hakoah-Eastern Suburbs and Alex Pongrass, St George-Budapest president led a concerted effort to bring in teams from Victoria over objections from the state association. Eventually, four Victorian clubs joined with the addition of a team from the Australian Capital Territory.

Teams

Stadiums and locations
Note: Table lists in alphabetical order.

League table

Results

Season statistics

Top scorers

Hat-tricks

Clean sheets

Awards

Source:

References

Footnotes

General references
OzFootball Archives - 1977 NSL Table

1977
1
AUS